Exanthemachrysis is a genus of haptophytes.

It includes the species Exanthemachrysis gayraliae.

References

Haptophyte genera